"She Used to Be My Girl" is the fourth episode of the sixteenth season of the American animated television series The Simpsons. It originally aired on the Fox network in the United States on December 5, 2004. It features actress Kim Cattrall from Sex and the City.

Plot
One day, Marge sees a friend from high school, Chloe Talbot, on TV and is jealous of her success as a news reporter. When they meet, an embarrassed Marge confesses she never left Springfield, but the two are glad to see each other again. Chloe comes to the Simpsons' house for dinner, but her exciting stories annoy Marge and inspire Lisa, who goes out to dinner with Chloe.

Marge reveals that she and Chloe were reporters for their high school newspaper, but after high school Marge stayed with her sweetheart Homer after Bart was born, with Chloe leaving her sweetheart Barney when he proposed. With all of Chloe's success, Marge seems to begin to resent both her decision and her family but receives supporting words from Homer.

On their way back from dinner, Chloe invites Lisa to the United Nations women's conference, with Lisa saying she would need parental permission. Upon arriving at the Simpsons house, a drunk Marge, who is worried that Lisa likes Chloe more, provokes Chloe and the two fight on the lawn. This leaves Marge with a black eye.

After Marge talks with Lisa about what happened, she forbids her to go to the women's conference, but Lisa sneaks out and hides in Chloe's car's trunk. Then, as Chloe drives off, her boss calls her, telling her to cover the story of the eruption of Springfield Volcano. When Lisa pops out of the trunk, Chloe has her be her cameraman after her original one fled at the sight of lava.

When Marge and Homer arrive at the women's conference to find Lisa, they see Chloe's live broadcast from the volcano, crediting Lisa behind the camera and the two trapped by a sea of lava. Marge and Homer race to the volcano and the former leaps from rock to rock to rescue Lisa. Moments later, Barney descends in a helicopter to rescue Chloe, who grants him a half hour of pity sex.

When Marge imagines her life as a reporter, she screams to her family, who shows little interest.

Production
The episode was written by Tim Long and guest starred Kim Cattrall as Chloe Talbot.

Reception
In its original American broadcast, "She Used to Be My Girl" was viewed by 10.3 million people.

References

External links 
 

The Simpsons (season 16) episodes
2004 American television episodes
Cultural depictions of Bob Dylan